Ways of Seeing is a 1972 television series of 30-minute films created chiefly by writer John Berger and producer Mike Dibb. It was broadcast on BBC Two in January 1972 and adapted into a book of the same name.

The series was intended as a response to Kenneth Clark's Civilisation TV series, which represents a more traditionalist view of the Western artistic and cultural canon, and the series and book criticise traditional Western cultural aesthetics by raising questions about hidden ideologies in visual images. According to James Bridle, Berger "didn't just help us gain a new perspective on viewing art with his 1972 series Ways of Seeing – he also revealed much about the world in which we live. Whether exploring the history of the female nude or the status of oil paint, his landmark series showed how art revealed the social and political systems in which it was made. He also examined what had changed in our ways of seeing in the time between when the art was made and today."

The series has had a lasting influence, and in particular introduced the concept of the male gaze, as part of his analysis of the treatment of the nude in European painting.  It soon became popular among feminists, including the British film critic Laura Mulvey, who used it to critique traditional media representations of the female character in cinema.

Episodes

Book
The book Ways of Seeing was written by Berger and Dibb, along with Sven Blomberg, Chris Fox, and Richard Hollis. The book consists of seven numbered essays: four using words and images; and three essays using only images. 

Now described as "revolutionary", the book has contributed to feminist readings of popular culture, through essays that focus particularly on how women are portrayed in advertisements and oil paintings. "Berger ... has had a profound influence on the popular understanding of art and the visual image," according to sociologists Yasmin Gunaratnam and Vikki Bell.

Reception 
The book and television series were considered groundbreaking. A 1994 critic noted

Notes

References

Further reading

External links

Recordings of Ways of Seeing on the Internet Archive

Works about art genres
Works about ideologies
1972 British television series debuts
BBC television documentaries
Documentary television series about art
1970s British documentary television series